Richard Lee Anderson (December 25, 1953 – June 23, 1989) was a Major League Baseball pitcher. He attended high school in Gardena, California.

Anderson was drafted by the New York Yankees in the first round of the 1972 Major League Baseball Draft. In 1979, Anderson was named the International League Pitcher of the Year with the Columbus Clippers. He made his major league debut with the Yankees on September 18, . This was the only game in which he pitched for the Yankees, as he was traded to the Seattle Mariners over the offseason. After developing arm problems during the  season, Anderson was released, effectively ending his career.

Anderson died from atherosclerosis  on June 23, 1989. When his body was discovered in his Wilmington, California home, he was holding a letter from a fan.

References

External links
, or Retrosheet, or Pura Pelota (Venezuelan Winter League)

1953 births
1989 deaths
Baseball players from Inglewood, California
Columbus Clippers players
Fort Lauderdale Yankees players
Jackson Mets players
Los Angeles Valley Monarchs baseball players
Major League Baseball pitchers
New York Yankees players
Oneonta Yankees players
Seattle Mariners players
Spokane Indians players
Syracuse Chiefs players
Tacoma Yankees players
Tiburones de La Guaira players
American expatriate baseball players in Venezuela
West Haven Yankees players
People from Wilmington, Los Angeles
Johnson City Yankees players